Star Vijay, commonly known as Vijay TV, is an Indian Tamil-language general entertainment private broadcast television network owned by Asianet Star Communications, a subsidiary of American multinational mass media corporation The Walt Disney Company.

This is a list of the current and former programmes broadcast by the channel.

Current programming

Fiction

Non-fiction

Upcoming broadcast

Former programming

Fiction

7C (2012–2013)
Aaha (2012)
Agni Satchi (2001–2002)
Amman (2010)
Anbe Vaa (2009–2010)
Anbudan Kushi (2020–2021)
Andal Azhagar (2014–2016)
Anjali (2019)
Aranmanai Kili (2018–2020)
Aval (2011–2013)
Avalum Naanum (2018–2019)
Ayudha Ezhuthu (2019–2020)
Bala Ganapathy (2015)
Bharatidasan Colony (2022)
Bommukutty Ammavukku (2020)
Butterflies (2000)
Bharathi Kannamma (2019-2023)
Chinna Thambi (2017–2019)
Deivam Thandha Veedu (2013–2017)
Dharmayutham (2012–2013)
Eeramana Rojave (2018–2021)
En Thozhi En Kadhali En Manaivi (2005–2007)
En Peyar Meenakshi (2010–2011)
Idhu Oru Kadhal Kathai (2005)
Jenmam X (1999)
Kadaikutty Singam (2019)
Kadhalikka Neramillai (2007–2008)
Kaatrin Mozhi(2019-2021)
Kalathu Veedu (2015–2016)
Kalyanamam Kalyanam (2018–2019)
Kalyanam Mudhal Kadhal Varai (2014–2017)
Kana Kaanum Kaalangal (2006–2013)
Kanchana (2012)
Kannadi Kadhavugal (2006)
Kanmani 
Kathu Karupu
Kavyanjali (2001–2002)
Lakshmi Kalyanam (2017)
Kudumbam Oru Kovil (2001)
Madurai (2007–2009)
Mahangalum Adisayangalum
Maharani (2009–2011)
Mappillai (2016–2017)
Marumagal (2001–2002)
Maya Machindra (1999)
Meendum Oru Kaadhal Kadhai (2007)
Meera (2010)
Mouna Raagam (2017–2020)
Mouna Raagam 2 (2021–2023)
Naam Iruvar Namakku Iruvar (2018–2022)
Nadhi Yenge Pogirathu (2002)
Nee Naan Aval (2003)
Neelakkuyil (2018–2019)
Neeli (2016–2017)
Nenjam Marappathillai (2017–2019)
Ninaika Therindha Maname (2017–2018)
Office (2013–2015)
Oonjal (1999)
Pagal Nilavu (2016–2019)
Parijatham (2011–2012)
Paavam Ganesan (2021–2022)
Payanam (2002–2003)
Pirivom Santhippom (2011–2013)
Ponmagal Vanthal (2018–2020)
Ponnukku Thanga Manasu (2018-2020)
Poovilangu (2010)
Puthu Kavithai (2013–2015)
Raja Rani (2017–2019)
Raja Paarvai (2021)
Rettai Vaal Kuruvi (2015)
Roja Kootam (2009–2010)
Salanam (2003)
Saravanan Meenatchi (2011–2018)
Senthoora Poove (2020–2022)
Sippikkul Muthu (2022)
Siva Manasula Sakthi (2019–2020)
Sundari Neeyum 
Sundaran Naanum (2019-2021)
Shriraman Shridevi (2002)
Tamil Kadavul Murugan (2017–2018)
Thaenmozhi B.A (2019-2021)
Tayumanavan (2013–2014)
Thazhampoo (2019)
Thillu Mullu (2004)
Vaidhegi Kaathirundhaal (2021–2022)
Vinnaithaandi Varuvaayaa (2016)
Velammal (2021)
Velaikkaran (2020–2022)
Yamirukka Bayamen (2010–2011)

Non-fiction

60 Nodi! Are You Ready?
Adhu Idhu Yedhu (2009-2019)
Anbudan DD (2017)
Anu Alavum Baiyamillai (2009-2010)
Atcham Thavir (2016)
Ayyappan Sannidhaanam
Azhagi (2006)
Anda Ka Kasam (2022-2023)
Back To School (2014–2015)
Bhakthi Thiruvizha
Bigg Boss Tamil (2017–2023)
Bigg Boss Jodigal (2021-2022)
Boys vs Girls
Cinema Karam Kappi 
Cooku With Comali (2019–2022)
Comedy Raja Kalakkal Rani (2021)
Connexion (2013-2017)
Dancing Super Stars
Dhool Dance
Divided (2018)
Doctor Doctor (2014–2015)
Enkitta Mothathe (2018–2019)
Fly Wheel
Gurupeyarchi
Home Sweet Home
Idhu Eppadi Iruku (2005)
Intensive Comedy Unit (2017)
Jodi Number One (2006–2019)
Jothida Darbar
Jothida Thagaval
King Queen Jack (2007)
Kadavul Padhi Mirugam Padhi (2008)
Kalakka Povathu Yaaru (2005-2020)
Kalakka Povathu Yaaru Champions (2017-2022)
Kathai Alla Nijam
Kings of Comedy Juniors (2017-2018)
Kings of Dance
Kitchen Super Star
Koffee with DD (2006-2017)
Little Genius 2.0 (2017)
Lollu Sabha (2003–2008)
Margazhi Vaibhavam
Mettugal Pudhusu
Mr and Mrs Chinnathirai (2019-2022)
Mrs. Chinnathirai (2017-2018)
My Choice (1998)
Naduvula Konjam Disturb Pannuvom (2013-2016)
Nalamudan Vazha
Namma Veetu Kalyanam (2008–2014)
Neengalum Vellalam Oru Kodi (2012–2016)
Namma Ooru Connexion (2017)
Odavum Mudiyadhu Oliyavum Mudiyadhu (2020)
Oru Varthai Oru Latcham - Tamizhodu Vilaiyadu
Oru Varthai Oru Latcham - Juniors
Paati Vaidhiyam
Pattu Paadava 
Raju Vootla Party (2022)
Reel Paadhi Real Paadhi (2008)
Ramar Veedu (2019)
Ready Steady Po
Sagala Vs Ragala
Samayal Samayal with Venkatesh Bhat (2014-2018) 
Sigaram Thotta Manithargal (2005–2006)
Sirippu Da (2016–2017)
Speed Get Set Go
Sri Ramanin Padhayil (2013–2014)
Start Music Tamil (2019–2022)
Super Singer (2006-2021)
Super Singer Junior (2007-2022)
Super Daddy (2021-2022)
The Wall India (2019–2020)
Time Pass
Vasool Rani (2005)
Vasool Vettai
Vijay Talkies
Villa To Village
Wife Kaila Life
Yes or No

Dubbed series

Adhe Kangal (2018 - 2020)
Adisaya Piraviyum Arpuda Pennum (2020)
Radha Krishna (2018)
Chandira Nandini (2016–2017)
Shivam (2012–2014)
Anbalae Azhagana Veedu (2011–2012)
Uravugal Thodarkathai (2011–2015)
En Kanavan En Thozhan (2012–2017)
En Anbu Thangaikku (2015–2017) 
En Vaazhkai (2014–2015)
Endrum Anbudan (2016–2017)
Ennudaya Thoddathil (2016)
Hara Hara Mahadeva (2016)
Kadhala Kadhala (2017–2019)
Karma
Kiranmala (2016)
Mahabharatam (2013–2014)
Mangayin Sabadham (2016)
Maya Mohini (2016)
Nandhavanam (2014–2016) 
Radha Krishna (2018-2019)
Ramayanam (2020)
Saibaba (2020)
Seedhayin Raman (2016–2017) 
Shri Krishna (2020) 
Idhu Kadhala(2013)
 Hatim (2004–2005)
 Karma 
 Khullja Sim Sim (2005)
 Shaka Laka Boom Boom (2004–2005)

Television films
Ramarin Photograph
Vijay Chithiram (2015)

References 

Star Vijay
Star Vijay
Disney Star